During the 1991–92 English football season, Cambridge United competed in the Football League Second Division.

Season summary
Cambridge had returned to English football's second tier after an absence of seven seasons, following two successive promotions. Few expected Cambridge to succeed at a high level after their rapid rise, five years after having to reapply for Football League status, but Cambridge managed to make the play-offs for promotion to the inaugural Premier League season with a fifth-place finish - their highest-ever placing in the Football League. Cambridge lost in the semi-finals to Leicester City - following a 1–1 draw at home in the first leg, they were hammered 5–0 at Filbert Street for a 6–1 aggregate loss - but even this cruel end to their promotion hopes did little to detract from what Cambridge had achieved in such a short period of time.

Crucial to Cambridge's success was free-scoring striker Dion Dublin; but in the off-season he left to join First Division runners-up Manchester United in a £1 million transfer, spreading doubt that Cambridge would be capable of improving and clinching promotion the next season.

Kit
Influence became Cambridge's new kit manufacturers, and introduced a new home kit for the season. The kit saw a return to tradition for Cambridge, with the club returning to its tradition dark orange shirts and black shorts, with black socks also worn. Fujitsu retained their sponsorship for away kits and, following the end of Cambridge's sponsorship deal with Howlett, became the home sponsors too.

First-team squad

Left club during season

Starting 11

Transfers

In
  Devon White -  Bristol Rovers, exchange, March 1992

Out
  John Taylor -  Bristol Rovers, £90,000, March 1992

Results

Second Division

League table

Results
Source:
 17 August: Port Vale 2–1 Oxford United (Foyle x2; ?) attendance 6,984

 5 October: Ipswich Town 2–1 Oxford United (Milton, Whitton; ?) attendance 9,922

 26 October: Oxford United 1–2 Leicester United (?; Wright, Thompson) attendance 5,206
 9 November: Portsmouth 2–1 Oxford United
 18 January: Oxford United 2–2 Port Vale (?; Houchen, Swan) attendance 4,199
 8 February: Leicester City 2–1 Oxford United (Kitson, Wright; ?) attendance 12,128
 21 March: Oxford United 2–1 Portsmouth

 25 April: Oxford United 1–1 Ipswich Town (?; Johnson) attendance 10,525
 Derby County 2–2 Oxford United
 Oxford United 2–0 Derby County

Play-Offs

FA Cup

League Cup

References

External links

Cambridge United F.C. seasons
Cambridge United F.C.